Samaro is a tehsil in the Sindh province of Pakistan. The town is the headquarters of a tehsil (an administrative subdivision) of Umarkot District.

History
During British rule the town was renamed Jamesabad (literally "Jamestown" - not to be confused with Jamesabad in Punjab) and was a subdivision of the old Tharparkar District (which had larger boundaries than today.)

According to the 1901 census the population was 24,038 - an increase almost 5,000 since the 1891 (19,208). The density of 48
persons per square mile was considerably above the District average. The Taluka contained 184 villages, of which Jamesabad was headquarters. The land revenue and cesses 1903-4 amounted to 370,000.

Now Samaro in District Umerkot. Samaro road is 7 km northeast from Samaro city it also developing area in Samaro.Rahu Abad is another neighbouring stop which is 7.5 kilometers away from Samaro, In this time it is a developing area in Taluka Samaro. Politically PPP was influential party when Dr Ghulam Ali was UC president But before the assassination of BB, Party neglected to all senior workers so Dr Ghulam Ali silent his mission. The former taluka nazim Samaro Zulfiqar Ali Khaskheli played a key role in the development of the city and its surroundings. Many development projects were carried out with many roads, infrastructure of the city and surrounding areas, education, health sector and other basic necessities were the top priorities.

Timabhagat Samaro 
The Timabhagat (Bhagat TEKAM Das) is the religious place of Hindus. The present building is due to the efforts of Late Bhagat ASHOK kumar Jeewani (Premi) sahib.
Now the new building is built with the new styles of tiles etc.

References

Populated places in Umerkot District
Talukas of Sindh